Stan Bharti is a Canadian businessman. He was the founder of Forbes & Manhattan, a merchant bank with a focus on resource-based sectors.

Early life
Bharti was born and raised in the Punjab Region of India. He received a scholarship to study engineering at the Peoples' Friendship University in Moscow, Russia and then went on to do a Masters of Engineering at the University of London.

Career
Following his education, he worked in Africa for a short period and then moved to Canada.

Bharti started his own consulting firm, BLM Inc., in 1988 to provide management and engineering services to the resource sector worldwide.

William Resources
Bharti became the president of William Resources, a gold public company listed in Toronto.  Acquisitions led the team to projects in Australia, South America, Mexico, and Scandinavia.  These included Sweden's Bjorkdal gold mine and Brazil's Jacobina gold mine.  Bharti and his team built the company up from a junior gold company to one that was, by 1997, producing more than 200,000 ounces of gold annually.

In 2002, Bharti established Forbes & Manhattan, Inc. to focus on the emergence of a new bull market in the resource sector. He purchased mines from floundering companies, developed them and sold them.  Since 2002, Forbes & Manhattan has developed companies almost exclusively in the mining sector.

Forbes and Manhattan
The Toronto-based private merchant bank is an incubator for resource companies.  They seek out high potential mining assets and take them from exploration and discovery to production. They have been successful with this formula for creating profits through acquiring large holdings in businesses, growing them through technical and management expertise and then selling them for significantly more than the purchase price.

Forbes & Manhattan's most successful project so far was in May 2011 when Consolidated Thompson Iron Mines, which began as a $1M dollar exploration iron ore company with assets in Quebec at the time of Forbes & Manhattan's first involvement, was developed and sold to Cliffs Natural Resources Inc. for $4.9 billion in cash.

Another successful project was Desert Sun Mining.  In 2002 Bharti acquired a controlling position in Desert Sun Mining.  He developed the Jacobina Mine to near production and then four years later sold the company for $735M to Yamana Gold.

Their most recent exit was the sale of Avion Gold Corp. to Endeavour Mining. Endeavour Mining purchased Avion Gold Corp on October 18, 2012, for US$389 million.

The main difference between Forbes & Manhattan and other merchant banks is they use technical expertise to develop their companies over long – 3–5-year time frames – rather than quickly flipping them.

The company retains approximately 100 professionals: geologists, lawyers, accountants, investment bankers, financial analysts, and mining analysts to support the companies under its umbrella.  The five main specialty divisions are gold and base metals mining, energy, wealth management, agriculture, and ferrous metals.

In March 2016, Forbes & Manhattan partnered with the Financial Times to host a summit on the reintegration of Iran into the world economy, which Bharti spoke at.

In 2016, Forbes & Manhattan completed a private placement of Carpathian Gold Corp. to manage the development of the largest undeveloped gold deposit in Europe, located in Rovina Valley, Romania.

Philanthropy
In November 2011, Bharti donated $10M to Laurentian University. While working as a mining engineer in Sudbury, Bharti used to give lectures at the engineering school at Laurentian University. Bharti's donation was to be used for providing funds for field trips, faculty recruitments, and improvements to the school's buildings.  In honour of his donation, the engineering school was renamed the Bharti School of Engineering.

In 2012, Bharti and Forbes & Manhattan contributed $40,000 to the Canadian Olympic 4x100-metre relay team during the Canadian Olympic Hall of Fame dinner and induction ceremonies

Bharti, through The Bharti Charitable Foundation, has also made numerous other smaller donations to a wide variety of causes.

References

External links 
 Forbes & Manhattan

Businesspeople from Toronto
Indian emigrants to Canada
Living people
Alumni of the University of London
Peoples' Friendship University of Russia alumni
Year of birth missing (living people)